Dimitris Anagnostopoulos (born 1970) is a Greek chess grandmaster. Anagnostopoulos grew up in England, where he was known as Demetrios Agnos, before switching federations to Greece in 1996. He played for "Kallithea Athens" (Greece) in the 7th European Chess Club Cup in 1990.

References

External links

Chess grandmasters
Living people
Greek chess players
1970 births
20th-century Greek people